BYD Electronic (International) Company Limited is a Chinese company manufacturing handset components and assembling mobile phones for its customers, which have included Nokia and Motorola. An OEM/ODM, the company is a spin-off of BYD Company initially being a subsidiary of that company.

History
Created as a subsidiary of BYD Co Ltd in 2002, it issued an IPO on the Hong Kong Stock Exchange in 2007 having been incorporated in Hong Kong on June 14, 2007.

Products
According to Wind data, in terms of the revenue composition of BYD in 2020, the mobile phone parts and assembly business accounted for 38.34%, the automotive business accounted for 53.64% and the secondary rechargeable battery business accounted for 7.72%.

Production bases
BYD Electronic has production bases both inside and outside of China. There are three overseas factories: one in Cluj, Romania; a Komárom, Hungary, production base that was acquired through the February 2008 purchase of Mirae Hungary Industrial Manufacturer Ltd; and a Chennai, India, base, which was also completed in 2008. In addition, BYD Electronic has production bases in Huizhou, Tianjin, and at Baolong Industrial Park, Longgang District, Shenzhen.

References

External links

Companies listed on the Hong Kong Stock Exchange
BYD Company
Chinese companies established in 2007
Electronics companies of China
Civilian-run enterprises of China
Mobile phone manufacturers